The Nussaiba Clan, commonly spelt in English as Nuseibeh (also spelt Nusaibah and Nusseibeh) is the oldest Muslim dynasty in Jerusalem. The Nussaiba family has a long history and tight bonds with the Holy Land, and the Christian people of the levant, since the days their first forefathers conquered Jerusalem in the 7th century.

According to tradition, the Nusseibeh family took its name from a female companion or Sahabiyah of the Islamic prophet Muhammad named Nusaybah bint Ka'ab. She was a member of the Ansar who transferred their political power over Medina to Muhammad. Nusaybah fought along with Muhammad in battle and was an early example of women taking leadership roles in Islam. Since the arrival of Islam in Jerusalem in the seventh century, the Sunni Muslim family has held the keys of the Church of the Holy Sepulchre, Christianity's holiest site, alongside the Joudeh family (who were added to the original arrangement in the time of Saladin, the Muslim conqueror who seized the holy city from the Crusaders in 1187). This arrangement emerged during the days of the second caliph Umar Ibn al-Khattab, who hoped to avoid clashes among rival Christian sects for control over the church. Although symbolic, the arrangement has provided the stability the Christians of the city needed, and is a symbol of tolerance and inter-religious harmony, and gave the Nussaiba family a visible role in Christian activities in Jerusalem, which include pilgrimages and visits by Western Christians.

Family roots
Ancestors of the family arrived in Jerusalem with the arrival of Islam in AD 637. However, the family married and mixed with multiple notable families of the levant from both Christian and Muslim religious backgrounds, such as the El-Issa Family and Al Ghussein family. The original muslim Nusseibeh clan included two companions of Muhammad — Abdullah bin Nussaiba and Mu'adh bin Jabal, and many other of Muhammad's companions and maternal uncles, descendants of Salma from Banu Najjar, a clan of the Khazraj, the wife of Hashim, forefather of the Hashemite Family and mother of its renowned leader Abdul Muttalib, grandfather of Muhammed. The Nussaiba family is a clan of the Khazraj tribe of Medina, known in Islam as al-Ansar, for their support and protection of Muhammed during his exile from Mecca.

Nussaiba and the Church of the Holy Sepulchre
 
When the prayer time came, the Archbishop of Jerusalem, Sophronius, invited the Caliph Umar, to pray at the Church of the Holy Sepulchre, Christianity's holiest site. Umar refused to do so, fearing that future Muslim generations would claim the church as their own and turn it into a mosque. Umar instead prayed a few yards away from the church where a mosque is built now. The Mosque of Umar still stands next to the Church of the Holy Sepulchre as a reminder of the strong Muslim-Christian bond in the Holy Land. Upon entering Jerusalem, Umar signed with the Christians of Jerusalem what became known as the "Covenant of Umar". It guaranteed protection for the Christians to live and worship freely and also protection for the Christian places of worship in exchange for the Christian surrender before the Arab Muslim army.

The ancient records and manuscripts kept by the various Christian denominations in their monasteries all record the Nussaiba family’s relationship and that of their ancestral forefathers from the Bani Ghanim al-Khazraj to the Holy Sepulchre, at least since the time of Saladin more than 800 years ago, specifically since 1192, when Sultan Saladin and King Richard the Lionheart concluded an agreement allowing western Christian pilgrims to visit the Holy Sepulchre under certain stipulations. Saladin entrusted the custody of the doors of the Holy Sepulchre to the leading and most renowned Shaikh Ghanim ben Ali ben Hussein al-Ansari al-Khazrajy, the Jerusalemite, and all matters pertaining to it. Ghanim had been born in Burin village near Nablus in AH 562, where his family had taken refuge after the crusader conquest of Jerusalem in (1087).

Notable members

Notable members of the family have included:

Anwar Nusseibeh a former Jordanian minister and diplomat to the UK
Bashar Ahmad Nuseibeh (1967–), Professor of Computing at The Open University, UK
Ghanem Nuseibeh civil engineer and founder of strategy and management consultancy, Cornerstone Global Associates
Hazem Nuseibeh Jordanian foreign minister
 Lana Zaki Nusseibeh, United Arab Emirates Permanent Representation to the United Nations and President of UN Women
 Sari Nusseibeh, professor of philosophy and president of the Al-Quds University in Jerusalem
 Zaki Nusseibeh, United Arab Emirates minister of state.

References

Further reading
 Fischbach, Michael R. "Nuseibeh Family." In Encyclopedia of the Palestinians, edited by Philip Mattar. New York: Facts on File, 2000.
 Heller, Mark, and Nusseibeh, Sari. No Trumpets, No Drums: A Two-State Settlement of the Israeli–Palestinian Conflict. New York: Hill and Wang, 1991.
 Muslih, Muhammad Y. The Origins of Palestinian Nationalism. New York: Columbia University Press, 1988.

 
Palestinian families
Jordanian families
Arab dynasties
Muslim dynasties
Families from Jerusalem